INSAT-2E is an Indian geostationary communications and weather satellite which is operated by the Indian National Satellite System. It is positioned in geostationary orbit at a longitude of 83° East, from where it is used to provide communications services to Asia and Australia. It also carries two meteorological instruments; the Very High Resolution Radiometer, and a CCD camera capable of returning images with a resolution of one kilometre.

The communications payload aboard INSAT-2E consists of seventeen G/H band (IEEE C band) transponders. Some of its transponders are leased to Intelsat, who operate them under the designation Intelsat APR-2.

INSAT-2E was launched by Arianespace, using an Ariane 42P carrier rocket flying from ELA-2 at the Guiana Space Centre. The launch occurred at 22:03 UTC on 2 April 1999. Following launch, it raised itself into geostationary orbit using liquid-fuelled apogee motor. Its final insertion burn occurred at 07:38 UTC on 8 April. Following insertion, it was positioned at a longitude of 83° East.

See also

1999 in spaceflight
List of Indian satellites

References

External links

Channels Details of INSAT 2E - Updating Regularly

INSAT satellites
Spacecraft launched in 1999
1999 in India